Katie Louisa Ardill,  (3 August 1886 – 3 January 1955) was an Australian medical doctor. She was the first woman to be appointed as a divisional surgeon in New South Wales, and a year later was among the first female doctors when she joined the British Expeditionary Forces in Egypt in 1915.

Early life and education 
Born in Chippendale, a suburb in inner Sydney, to George Edward Ardill, an Australian politician, and Louisa, née Wales. Schooled at Wellesley College, Ardill graduated from University of Sydney on 9 April 1913 with a degree in medicine.

In 1913, Ardill completed a one-year internship at the Prince Alfred Hospital and served as an honorary anaesthetist and out-patients medical officer at the South Sydney Women's Hospital. During that year she began working as a lecturer and an examiner of first aid and Home Nursing Classes at the St. John Ambulance Association's Training Branch, and joined the St John Ambulance Brigade Headquarters Nursing Division a year later.

Career 
Ardill served as a doctor for four years during World War I, respectively in Britain, France and Egypt. Her application to serve with the Australian Expeditionary Forces was rejected because she was a woman. At that time, Australian government policy prohibited women from service, compelling them to join overseas units instead. Katie therefore travelled to Britain via Egypt to become one of the first women doctors in the British Expeditionary Forces field services. She worked at the County Middlesex War Hospital, St. Albans, England. This was previously an asylum, but in September 1915 it was reopened as a hospital to treat wounded soldiers as they arrived from the Western Front. It is unclear what her role was at this hospital, which had 1600 beds and the capacity to treat 250 men in its specialist military mental health unit. However, the unit was run by the Royal Army Medical Corps and the Queen Alexandra's Imperial Military Nursing Service, and received volunteer staff from Voluntary Aid Detachments, the Red Cross, and St John's Ambulance among others, it is likely that she entered the hospital as a volunteer recruited from one of the latter units. She then worked at the Anglo-Belgian Base Clearing Military Hospital at Étaples in France, where she was the only Australian woman doctor until 1917, and was later promoted to the rank of captain. Other service included posts at Napbury, the Dover military hospital, and the Citadel hospital, Cairo, all with the British Army.

Post-WWI 
When she returned to Australia in August 1919, Ardill rejoined the Sydney Central Nursing Division, returned to her hospital work, and established a gynaecological practice in Macquarie Street, Sydney. She later began to offer a free clinic from her Macquarie Street rooms for wives and children of servicemen.

On 1 June 1921, she married Charles Christie Brice at St Andrews Cathedral in Sydney. Her husband was a law student at the time and later became an accountant.

From 1933, she was an honorary member of the Racial Hygiene Association of New South Wales (which eventually became the  Family Planning Association of New South Wales), having become a consultant in 1932. After joining the St John Ambulance Brigade, she became an executive member from 1938, served as deputy chairman in 1947–48, and became the Brigade's first chairwoman in New South Wales, a role she held from 1950 to 1955.

In 1952, Ardill travelled to England with her husband, captain Charles Brice; while there she studied atomic bomb defence at the British Military School of Civil Defence.

She researched treatment for atomic blast in Britain in 1952, and died on 3 January 1955.

Awards and honours 
In 1929 Katie Louisa Ardill was appointed a life member of the St John Ambulance Association. She was admitted to the Order of St John as a member in 1938, was promoted to Officer of the Order in 1943, and in 1947 was promoted to the Commander of the Order. She was promoted "Dame of Grace" of the order of St John of Jerusalem in 1952, having served as a sister from the date of her admission to the order in 1938. She was made an Officer of the Order of the British Empire in 1941.

References

External links
 https://sites.google.com/site/archoevidence/home/ww1womendoctors

1886 births
1955 deaths
Australian women medical doctors
Australian medical doctors
Australian gynaecologists
Australian dentists
Australian Officers of the Order of the British Empire
Australian women of World War I
Royal Army Medical Corps officers
Medical doctors from Sydney
19th-century Australian women
20th-century dentists